Andriy Yuriyovych Kozhukhar (born 20 July 1999) is a Ukrainian professional footballer who plays for Zemplín Michalovce.

Club career
He made his Ukrainian Premier League debut for Chornomorets Odesa on 10 November 2018 in a game against Desna Chernihiv.

References

External links
 
 

1999 births
Living people
People from Tiraspol
Ukrainian footballers
Ukrainian expatriate footballers
Ukraine youth international footballers
Ukraine under-21 international footballers
Association football goalkeepers
FC Chornomorets Odesa players
Ukrainian Premier League players
Ukrainian First League players
Valmieras FK players
MFK Zemplín Michalovce players
Latvian Higher League players
Slovak Super Liga players
Expatriate footballers in Latvia
Expatriate footballers in Slovakia
Ukrainian expatriate sportspeople in Latvia
Ukrainian expatriate sportspeople in Slovakia